Astapkovich is a Belarusian surname. Notable people with the surname include:

Igor Astapkovich (born 1963), Belarusian hammer thrower
Nikolay Astapkovich (1954–2000), Belarusian and Soviet sprint canoeist

Belarusian-language surnames